Karachi Bakery is a chain of Indian retail bakeries. It was established in Hyderabad in 1953, with the opening of its first bakery in Moazzam Jahi Market. It bakes fruit biscuits, Dil Kush and Plum Cake.

Apart from Hyderabad, Karachi Bakery also has outlets in Bengaluru, Chennai and Delhi. The chain also exports a selection of their products to other countries, including Europe, United States, Canada, Australia, New Zealand, Africa and the Middle East.

History
The bakery was founded by Sri Khanchand Ramnani. In 1953, Ramnani opened the first Karachi Bakery of Hyderabad next to Seena Bakery in Moazzam Jahi Market.

References

External links
 Official site

Bakeries of India
Manufacturing companies based in Hyderabad, India
Cuisine of Karachi
Indian companies established in 1953